Lovell Manufacturing Company, also known as Lovell Place, is an historic factory complex and national historic district which is located at Erie, Erie County, Pennsylvania. 

It was added to the National Register of Historic Places in 1997.

History and architectural features
It includes nine contributing buildings. The buildings and their additions were built between 1883 and 1946. They are characterized as simple brick industrial buildings with shallow gable and parapet roofs, and housed a manufacturer of bed springs, mouse and rat traps, wringers, and dryers. Included in the complex were a foundry and machine shop and a sports gear outlet. A cricket ball that was "Indian made" but branded "Lovell PA EERIE" on the reverse is preserved in a private collection in Australia. It likely would have been sold in a retail outlet in the complex.

It was added to the National Register of Historic Places in 1997.

References

Industrial buildings and structures on the National Register of Historic Places in Pennsylvania
Historic districts on the National Register of Historic Places in Pennsylvania
Buildings and structures in Erie, Pennsylvania
National Register of Historic Places in Erie County, Pennsylvania